The Window; or, The Songs of the Wrens is a song cycle by Arthur Sullivan with words by Alfred, Lord Tennyson.  Written in 1867–70, it was eventually published in 1871. There are multiple versions of the title: On the cover of the 1871 edition, the subtitle is given as "The Loves of the Wrens", however, "Songs of the Wrens" is used on the frontispiece and is the one generally used.

Background
George Grove, the secretary of The Crystal Palace, originally suggested a collaboration between Tennyson and Sullivan on a German-style song cycle, in English, but similar to Schubert's Die Schöne Müllerin.  Grove was a friend of Sullivan's and an early promoter of his music.  An English-language narrative song cycle, like Schubert's, was a novelty.  John Everett Millais agreed to illustrate the poems for a handsome publication.  On October 17, 1866, Grove and Sullivan dined with Tennyson at his home on the Isle of Wight, where they began to discuss the piece.

By February 1867, Tennyson had a draft of the text, but Sullivan noted in a letter he wrote home from Tennyson's house on February 10:

He read me all the songs (twelve in number), which are absolutely lovely, but I fear there will be a great difficulty in getting them from him.  He thinks they are too light, and will damage his reputation, &c.  All this I have been combating, whether successfully or not I shall be able to tell you tomorrow.

In August 1867, Tennyson had revised the words, and they were printed privately by Sir Ivor Guest.  But Tennyson refused to allow publication until November 1870, when he finally agreed.  By this time, however, Millais had sold the drawings he had prepared, except for one, and he was too busy to work any further on the project.

The songs were finally published early in 1871 and included the twelve poems by Tennyson, eleven of which Sullivan had set to music, just the one illustration by Millais, and the following preface by Tennyson:

Four years ago Mr. Sullivan requested me to write a little song-cycle, German fashion, for him to exercise his art upon. He had been very successful in setting such old songs as "Orpheus with his Lute", and I drest up for him, partly in the old style, a puppet, whose almost only merit is, perhaps, that it can dance to Mr. Sullivan's instrument. I am sorry that my four year old puppet should have to dance at all in the dark shadow of these days [the siege of Paris in the Franco-Prussian War]; but the music is now completed, and I am bound by my promise.  In 1900, a second edition omitted the illustration and Tennyson's preface.

Songs in the cycle
I. On the Hill – "The Lights and Shadows fly."
II. At the Window – "Vine, Vine and Eglantine."
III. Gone! – "Gone ! Gone till the end of the year."
IV. Winter – "The Frost is here, and Fuel is dear."
V. Spring – "Birds' Love and Bird's Song."
VI. The Letter – "Where is another Sweet as my Sweet?"
VII. No Answer – "The Mist and the Rain."
VIII. No Answer. – "Winds are loud and you are dumb."
IX. The Answer – "Two little Hands that meet."
IXB. Ay! – "Be merry, all birds, to-day."1
X. When? – "Sun comes, Moon comes, Time slips away."
XI. Marriage Morning – "Light so low upon Earth."

1 Sullivan did not set this song, but it is included in the score as poetry.

Recordings
The song cycle was recorded in 1989 by Peter Allanson (baritone) and Stephen Betteridge (piano) on Symposium, 1074, as part of their recording, An Album of Victorian Song. The cycle is part of the 2017 Chandos Records collection, Songs, which includes 35 other Sullivan songs. The Window is sung by tenor Ben Johnson. David Owen Norris accompanies.

Notes

References

External links
List of songs in The Window and links to Midi files, lyrics and vocal score
Tennyson's introduction and text of the song cycle
Review of The Window in The Times, 16 December 1870

Classical song cycles in English
Art songs
1870 songs
Compositions by Arthur Sullivan
Works by Alfred, Lord Tennyson